Glory Road is a 1963 fantasy novel by Robert A. Heinlein.

Glory Road may also refer to:

 Glory Road (film), 2006 movie about the 1966 Texas Western College Miners basketball team
 Glory Road (Richard Clapton album), 1987
 Glory Road (Gillan album), 1980
 Glory Road, 1952 American Civil War history by Bruce Catton, second of his Army of the Potomac trilogy
The Glory Road, a 2005 posthumous album by Fern Jones